Poul Petersen is a Danish former badminton player. He was a Danish National Championship three times in the doubles with Per Walsøe and Svend Pri. In addition he won the Nordic Championship in 1972 and was capped by Denmark in the early 1970s.  His greatest achievement was winning the 1970 All England Badminton Championships doubles title with Tom Bacher.

Record at the All England

References

Danish male badminton players
Possibly living people
Year of birth missing